Bluestem may refer to:

Bluestem Lake, reservoir in Osage County, Oklahoma, United States
Bluestem, a literary magazine published by Eastern Illinois University

See also
Bluestem grass (disambiguation)